José Manuel ("Chema") Martínez Fernández (born 22 October 1971 in Madrid) is a Spanish long-distance runner. He is married to Spanish field hockey player Nuria Moreno.

Martínez's first major win came at the 1999 Summer Universiade, where he became the champion in the 10,000 metres. He competed at the 2001 World Championships in Athletics, finishing 13th in the final, but was more successful at the European Athletics Championships, in which he won the 2002 gold medal in the 10,000 m, and returned to take the silver medal at the following edition in 2006. He won the San Silvestre Vallecana 10K race in Madrid in 2003.

Martínez has represented Spain at the Olympics on two occasions: in 2004, finishing ninth in the 10,000 m, and at the 2008 Beijing Olympics, at which he was 16th in the Olympic marathon race.

Other significant achievements include a win at the Madrid Marathon in 2008 (his first marathon win), a bronze medal at the 2005 Mediterranean Games, a silver medal in the half marathon at the 2009 Mediterranean Games and an eighth-place finish in the marathon at the 2009 World Championships in Athletics. He has competed at the IAAF World Cross Country Championships on numerous occasions, with his best performance of 17th coming at the 2003 edition.

He ran in the 2010 Cursa de Bombers and finished in third place with a time of 28:54. Martínez took third at the European Cup 10000m in early June, although he was some distance behind the winner Mo Farah of Great Britain. He was Spain's top contender for the marathon at the 2010 European Athletics Championships in Barcelona. He won the silver medal but was satisfied with the performance as winner Viktor Röthlin set a fast pace in the hot race. Martínez ended the year at the San Silvestre Vallecana, where he finished fourth.

He began his 2011 season at the European Cup 10000m and finished as the runner-up behind Yousef El Kalai.

He won the Spanish edition of the Wings For Life World Run in 2014 and 2015. He ran 55.56 km in 2014 finishing 40th of the global rank and 59.19 km in 2015 to get the 48th position.

Achievements

Personal bests
5000 metres - 13:11.13 min (Huelva, 2006)
10000 metres - 28:09 min (Manchester, 2007)
Marathon - 2:08:09 hrs (Rotterdam, 2003)

References

1971 births
Living people
Spanish male long-distance runners
Spanish male marathon runners
Athletes (track and field) at the 2004 Summer Olympics
Athletes (track and field) at the 2008 Summer Olympics
Olympic athletes of Spain
Athletes from Madrid
European Athletics Championships medalists
Mediterranean Games silver medalists for Spain
Mediterranean Games bronze medalists for Spain
Athletes (track and field) at the 2005 Mediterranean Games
Athletes (track and field) at the 2009 Mediterranean Games
Universiade medalists in athletics (track and field)
Mediterranean Games medalists in athletics
Universiade gold medalists for Spain
Medalists at the 1999 Summer Universiade